Silviomyza is a genus of horse flies in the family Tabanidae.

Distribution
Sri Lanka.

Species
Silviomyza picea (Szilády, 1926)

References

Brachycera genera
Tabanidae
Diptera of Asia
Taxa named by Cornelius Becker Philip